Big Balls and the Great White Idiot was one of the first and best known German punk rock bands. They were founded in Hamburg in 1975 by Peter Grund (drums, vocals, text), "Baron Adolf Kaiser" (vocals),Wolfgang Lorenz (guitar) and the Grund brothers, Alfred (bass, vocals) and Atli (guitar).    
"Baron Adolf" provoked the audience by wearing a Nazi uniform and a black moustache as an expression of anarchy. Performances on stage were highly aggressive; the band was known to shout at the audience to go home. Punk News magazine called their sound "mean and ugly."

Their first
album was released in 1977 by Teldec, named Big Balls. Among the 17 songs were a cover version of the Sex Pistols' "Anarchy in the U.K.", in this case "Anarchy in Germany," and another of Velvet Underground. In 1978 the second album Foolish Guys followed. The next two albums, Artikel 1 and Creepy Shades, were released by their own label Balls Records, the latter bringing a change in sound away from punk.

The decline of punk rock did not affect the close ties between the band and their fans, but the 1980s saw the "Balls" (with French guitarist Hervé Rozoum) more often in theaters contributing their music to various stageplays.

Their latest album from 1999 was "In Search for Love", and were scheduled to tour Japan in 2000/2001.

External links
Interview with Big Balls and the Great White Idiot
Big Balls and the Great White Idiot official website

German punk rock groups
Musical groups from Hamburg